József Pércsi (19 March 1942 – June 2011) was a Hungarian wrestler. Born in Földes, he competed in the 1972 Summer Olympics.

References

External links 
 
 

1942 births
2011 deaths
Olympic wrestlers of Hungary
Wrestlers at the 1972 Summer Olympics
Hungarian male sport wrestlers